Responsorium is an album by  Argentine musician Dino Saluzzi recorded in 2001 and released on the ECM label.

Reception
The Allmusic review awarded by Scott Yanow awarded the album 4 stars stating "The mood is sometimes wistful and nostalgic, but it is not derivative of the past. A delightful set". The JazzTimes review by Thomas Conrad stated "Saluzzi's compositions on Responsorium are melodically rich, but their first impression of simplicity is deceptive".

Track listing
All compositions by Dino Saluzzi
 "A Mi Hermano Celso" - 8:05 
 "Mónica" - 8:21 
 "Responso Por la Muerte de Cruz" - 9:07 
 "Dele..., Don!!" - 7:42 
 "Los Hijos de Fierro (Reprise)" - 2:19 
 "La Pequeña Historia de...!" - 7:05 
 "Cuchara" - 7:43 
 "Vienen del Sur los Recuerdos" - 6:33 
 "Pampeana "Mapu"" - 6:29 
Recorded Rainbow Studio in Oslo, Norway in November 2001

Personnel
Dino Saluzzi — bandoneón
José Maria Saluzzi — acoustic guitar
Palle Danielsson — double bass

References

http://www.allmusic.com/album/responsorium-mw0000018793/credits

ECM Records albums
Dino Saluzzi albums
2003 albums
Albums produced by Manfred Eicher